Canoeing competitions at the 2015 Pan American Games surrounding Toronto were held in two disciplines: the sprint, from 11 to 14 July and the slalom, from 18 to 19 July. The slalom competition will be held at the Minden Wild Water Preserve in Minden Hills. The sprint events were staged at the Welland Pan Am Flatwater Centre in Welland.

At the Pan American Sports Organization's 2013 general assembly in Jamaica, canoe slalom competitions were added to the program. This was the first time slalom was staged at the Pan American Games. Furthermore, women also competed in canoe races for the first time ever in both disciplines.

The winners of the five canoe slalom competitions (besides the C-1 women event, which is not an Olympic event) qualified for the 2016 Summer Olympics in Rio de Janeiro, Brazil. If Brazil, the host nation of the Olympics, won any events, the runner up qualified instead.

Competition schedule

The following is the competition schedule for the canoeing competitions:

Medal table

Medalists

Slalom

Sprint
Men

Women

Participating nations
A total of 17 countries have qualified athletes. The number of athletes a nation has entered is in parentheses beside the name of the country.

Qualification

A quota of 160 canoers (40 slalom and 120 sprint) will be allowed to qualify. A maximum of fifteen athletes can compete for a nation in sprint, while a maximum of six can compete in slalom.

See also
Canoeing at the 2016 Summer Olympics

References

 
Events at the 2015 Pan American Games
Pan American Games
2015
Canoeing and kayaking competitions in Canada